Ilyasi Masjid is a mosque located in Abbottabad District, Pakistan.

History
The mosque was built in 1932.

According to a research by professors of Bahauddin Zakaria University, this mosque was built in 1932 on top of a stream coming out of the mountain. According to the research paper, it is the oldest and largest mosque in Abbottabad city. According to the mosque administration, there is a capacity of about 10,000 worshippers.

References

Abbottabad District
Mosques in Khyber Pakhtunkhwa
1932 establishments in British India
20th-century mosques